Bacchisa discoidalis is a species of beetle in the family Cerambycidae. It was described by Thomson in 1865. It is known from Sumatra.

References

D
Beetles described in 1865